The 2003 FIA Sportscar Championship Estoril was the first race for the 2003 FIA Sportscar Championship season held at Autódromo do Estoril and ran a distance of two hours, thirty minutes.  It took place on April 13, 2003.

Official results
Class winners in bold.  Cars failing to complete 75% of winner's distance marked as Not Classified (NC).

Statistics
 Pole Position - #16 Pescarolo Sport - 1:48.721
 Distance - 284.376 km
 Average Speed - 113.504 km/h

References

E
FIA Sportscar
6 Hours of Estoril